Salem Silk known as Salem Venpattu refer to silk clothes made in Salem, Tamil Nadu. It received  Intellectual Property Rights Protection or Geographical Indication (GI) status.

References

Saris
Salem district
Silk in India
Geographical indications in Tamil Nadu